This is a list of films released or scheduled for release in the year 2018.

Box office 
The top films released in 2018 by worldwide Box Office gross revenue in Indian rupees are as follows

Scheduled releases

January – June

July–December

Dubbed films

Events

Award ceremonies

Notable deaths

References

External links

2018
Telugu
Telugu